Yashar Sharifi Niknafs is an American scientist, coder, and businessman. He currently serves as the Chief Executive Officer of Lynx Dx, Inc., one of the largest providers of COVID-19 PCR testing in the state of Michigan.

Early life and education 
Niknafs attended Stow-Munroe Falls High School in Akron, Ohio, where he was involved in theater and Science Olympiad. He completed his undergraduate studies at Case Western Reserve University, earning a Bachelor's of Science in Biochemistry before moving to Ann Arbor, Michigan, where he received his PhD from the Cell and Molecular Biology Program at the University of Michigan under the mentorship of Arul Chinnaiyan. His Ph.D. work focused mostly on bioinformatic analyses of next generation sequencing data for the purposes of better understanding the genome, delineating molecular mechanisms driving cancer, and discovering novel gene targets as biomarker candidates. He remained at the institution to complete a postdoctoral fellowship in cancer genomics and bioinformatics.

Career 
The Chinnaiyan laboratory had previously identified the TMPRSS2-ERG (T2-ERG) gene fusion as a novel biomarker for prostate cancer. Rather than continuing his medical school training, Niknafs took an extended leave-of-absence and co-founded LynxDx with Chinnaiyan and Jeffrey J Tosoian, a prominent urologic oncologist, with the intent to bring to market MyProstateScore, a pre-biopsy test using the T2-ERG, PCA3, and KLK3 biomarkers to detect clinically significant prostate cancer. He also wrote the code for the company's proprietary laboratory information management system.

Following the onset of the COVID-19 pandemic, the company pivoted to providing PCR testing for detection of the virus, quickly becoming one of the largest providers of such testing in the state. LynxDx provides weekly COVID-19 testing to the University of Michigan and to the Detroit Public Schools Community District.

Publications 
Partial list:

 Hosono Y, Niknafs YS, Prensner JR, Iyer MK, Dhanasekaran SM, Mehra R, Pitchiaya S, Tien J, Escara Wilke J, Poliakov A, Sankar K, Su F, Guo S, Freier SM, Bui H, Cao X, Malik R, Johnson TM, Beer DG,  Feng FY, Zhou W, Chinnaiyan AM. Oncogenic Role of THOR, a Conserved Cancer/Testis Long  Noncoding RNA. Cell. 2017.
 YS Niknafs, B. Pandian, T. Gajjar, Z. Gaudette, K. Wheelock, M.P. Maz, R.K. Achar, M. Song, C.  Massaro, X. Cao, A.M. Chinnaiyan, MiPanda: A Resource for Analyzing and Visualizing Next-Generation  Sequencing Transcriptomics Data, Neoplasia, 2018. 
 Niknafs YS, Pandian B, Iyer HK, Chinnaiyan AM, Iyer MK. TACO produces robust multi-sample  transcriptome assemblies from RNA-seq. Nature Methods. 2016. 
 Niknafs YS, Han S, Ma T, Speers C, Zhang C, Wilder-Romans K, Iyer MK, Pitchiaya S, Malik R, Hosono  Y, Prensner JR, Poliakov A, Singhal U, Xiao L, Kregel S, Siebenaler RF, Zhao SG, Uhl M, Gawronski A,  Hayes DF, Pierce LJ, Cao X, Collins C, Backofen R, Sahinalp CS, Rae JM, Chinnaiyan AM, Feng FY. The  lncRNA landscape of breast cancer reveals a role for DSCAM-AS1 in breast cancer progression. Nature  Communications. 2016.  
 Shukla S, Zhang X, Niknafs YS, Xiao L, Mehra R, Cieślik M, Ross A, Schaeffer E, Malik B, Guo S,  Freier SM, Bui HH, Siddiqui J, Jing X, Cao X, Dhanasekaran SM, Feng FY, Chinnaiyan AM, Malik R  Identification and validation of PCAT14 as a prognostic biomarker in prostate cancer. Neoplasia. 2016.  
 Iyer MK, Niknafs YS, Malik R, Singhal U, Sahu A, Hosono Y, Barrette TR, Prensner JR, Evans JR,  Zhao S, Poliakov A, Cao X, Dhanasekaran SM, Wu Y-M, Robinson DR, Beer DG, Feng FY, Iyer HK,  Chinnaiyan AM. The landscape of long noncoding RNAs in the human transcriptome. Nature Genetics.  2015 Jan 19.

References 

Year of birth missing (living people)
Living people
University of Michigan